John Perkins (born January 28, 1945) is an American author.  His best known book is Confessions of an Economic Hit Man (2004), in which Perkins describes playing a role in a process of economic colonization of Third World countries on behalf of what he portrays as a cabal of corporations, banks, and the United States government. The book's claims were met with skepticism and rebuttal by some involved parties. The book spent more than 70 weeks on the New York Times bestseller list.

Perkins has also written about mystical aspects of indigenous cultures, including shamanism.

Biography
Perkins graduated from the Tilton School in 1963. He subsequently attended Middlebury College for two years before dropping out. He later earned a Bachelor of Science degree in business administration from Boston University in 1968.  He was a Peace Corps Volunteer in Ecuador from 1968 to 1970.  He spent the 1970s working for the Boston strategic-consulting firm Chas. T. Main; he claims to have been screened for this job by the National Security Agency (NSA) and subsequently hired by Einar Greve, a member of the firm (alleged by Perkins to have been acting as an NSA liaison, a claim that Greve has denied). Perkins claims that he was seduced and trained as an "economic hitman" by a mysterious businesswoman named Claudine, who used his NSA personality profile to manipulate and control him.

As Chief Economist at Chas. T. Main, Perkins claims to have advised the World Bank, United Nations, IMF, U.S. Treasury Department, Fortune 500 corporations, and countries in Africa, Asia, Latin America, and the Middle East. Perkins alleges that he worked directly with heads of state and CEOs of major companies. Perkins's time at Chas T. Main provides the basis for his subsequent claims that, as an "economic hit man", he was charged with inducing developing countries to borrow large amounts of money, designated to pay for questionable infrastructure investments, but ultimately with a view to making the debt-laden countries more dependent, economically and politically, upon the West.

In the 1980s Perkins left Main and founded and directed an independent energy company. Perkins implies in New Confessions of an Economic Hitman, published in 2016, that he was poisoned in 2005 on behalf of the NSA or CIA. Doctors diagnosed him with diverticulosis.

Controversy 
Sebastian Mallaby, economics columnist of the Washington Post, reacted sharply to Perkins' book: describing him as "a conspiracy theorist, a vainglorious peddler of nonsense, and yet his book, Confessions of an Economic Hit Man, is a runaway bestseller." Mallaby, a member of the Council on Foreign Relations, holds that Perkins' conception of international finance is "largely a dream" and that his "basic contentions are flat wrong." As an example, Mallaby states that Indonesia reduced its infant mortality and illiteracy rates by two-thirds after economists persuaded its leaders to borrow money in 1970.

Articles in the New York Times and Boston magazine have referred to a lack of documentary or testimonial evidence to corroborate the claim that the NSA was involved in his hiring by Chas T. Main. After an extensive investigation, the New York Times concluded that "the arc of Mr. Perkins's career seems to be described accurately," although they did not find evidence to support "some of his fancier claims," including those involving the NSA.

Chas. T. Main's former vice president Einar Greve, who first offered Perkins a job at the firm, agreed that foreign debt represented a poor economic strategy for developing nations:Basically his story is true.… What John's book says is, there was a conspiracy to put all these countries on the hook, and that happened. Whether or not it was some sinister plot or not is up to interpretation, but many of these countries are still over the barrel and have never been able to repay the loans.However, Greve denied many aspects of Perkins' claims, such as the NSA having any links to Main, or that Perkins was seduced by Claudine Martin, saying that he believes that Perkins has convinced himself that his story is accurate. Boston Magazine noted that Perkins can provide little documentation to support his claims of international intrigue, describing a largely unconvincing "flimsy package of materials." A number of Perkins' former colleagues disagreed with his perspective on the company and contradicted specific claims he made; Frank Fullerton, one of his supervisors, stated that Perkins left Chas T. Main because he "thought he was worth more than he was."

In a 2006 statement, American State Department stated that much of the book "appears to be a total fabrication... the National Security Agency is a cryptological (codemaking and codebreaking) organization, not an economic organization... Neither of [its] missions anything remotely resembling placing economists at private companies in order to increase the debt of foreign countries."

Bibliography 
 Touching the Jaguar: Transforming Fear into Action to Change Your Life and the World (2020), Berrett-Koehler Publishers; .
The New Confessions of an Economic Hitman (2016), Berrett-Koehler Publishers; .
 Hoodwinked: An Economic Hit Man Reveals Why the World Financial Markets Imploded – and What We Need to Do to Remake Them (2009), Crown Business; 
 The Secret History of the American Empire (2007), Plume; 
 A Game as Old as Empire: the Secret World of Economic Hit Men and the Web of Global Corruption (edited by Steven Hiatt, introduction by John Perkins) (2007), Berrett-Koehler; 
 Confessions of an Economic Hit Man (2004), Berrett-Koehler; 

Perkins's books on mystical aspects of indigenous cultures, including shamanism, include:
 Spirit of the Shuar: Wisdom from the Last Unconquered People of the Amazon (2001), co-authors Shakaim Mariano Shakai Ijisam Chumpi, Shakaim Mariano Ijisam Chumpi, Destiny Books, 
 Psychonavigation: Techniques for Travel Beyond Time (2nd 1999), Destiny Books, 
 Shapeshifting: Shamanic Techniques for Global and Personal Transformation (1997), Destiny Books, 
 The World Is As You Dream It: Teachings from the Amazon and Andes (1994), Destiny Books, 
 The Stress Free Habit: Powerful Techniques for Health and Longevity from the Andes, Yucatan, and the Far East (1989), Healing Arts Books,

References

External links 

johnperkins.org John Perkins Official Web Site

1945 births
Living people
People from Hanover, New Hampshire
American activists
American political writers
American anti-globalization writers
American male non-fiction writers
American spiritual writers
Middlebury College alumni
Boston University School of Management alumni
Peace Corps volunteers
Writers from New Hampshire